Backrest or back-rest may refer to:

 Part of a chair, sofa, Bench or other such furniture used for resting one's back
 Fishing rod backrest
 Sissy bar, a backrest on a motorcycle